Sekou Sidibe (born 5 May 2001) is a footballer who plays as a forward for FC U Craiova 1948 in the Liga I. Born in the Ivory Coast, Sidibe represented Belgium at youth international level.

References

2001 births
Living people
Belgian footballers
Belgium youth international footballers
Black Belgian sportspeople
Belgian expatriate footballers
Ivorian footballers
Belgian people of Ivorian descent
Ivorian emigrants to Belgium
Ivorian expatriate footballers
Association football forwards
Eerste Divisie players
Eredivisie players
Liga I players
Beerschot A.C. players
PSV Eindhoven players
Jong PSV players
FC Emmen players
FC U Craiova 1948 players
Belgian expatriate sportspeople in the Netherlands
Ivorian expatriate sportspeople in the Netherlands
Expatriate footballers in the Netherlands
Belgian expatriate sportspeople in Romania
Ivorian expatriate sportspeople in Romania
Expatriate footballers in Romania